The 2016 Supercopa Argentina Final (officially the Supercopa Argentina 2016 "Burger King" for sponsorship reasons) was the 5th edition of the Supercopa Argentina, an annual football match contested by the winners of the Argentine Primera División and Copa Argentina competitions. Lanús beat River Plate 3–0 in La Plata and won the trophy.

Qualified teams

Match

Details

Statistics

References 

2017 in Argentine football
2016
Supercopa Argentina 2016
February 2017 sports events in South America
Supercopa Argentina 2016
Sport in La Plata